The Copa Mercosur 2000 was the 3rd staging of the international club cup.

The competition started on 1 August 2000 and concluded on 20 December 2000 with Vasco da Gama beating Palmeiras in the final.

Participants

 Atlético Mineiro
 Corinthians
 Cruzeiro
 Flamengo
 Palmeiras
 São Paulo
 Vasco da Gama
 Boca Juniors
 Independiente
 River Plate
 Rosario Central
 San Lorenzo
 Vélez Sarsfield
 Nacional
 Peñarol
 Cerro Porteño
 Olimpia
 Colo-Colo
 Universidad Católica
 Universidad de Chile

Details
 The 20 teams were divided into 5 groups of 4 teams. Each team plays the other teams in the group twice. The top team from each group qualified for the quarter-finals along with the best 3 runners up.
 From the quarter finals to the final, two legs were played in each round. In the result of a draw, the match was decided by a penalty shoot out.

Group stage

Group A

Group B

Group C

Group D

Group E

Quarter-finals

First leg

Second leg

River Plate won 6–4 on aggregate.

1–1 on aggregate, Vasco da Gama won 5–4 on penalties.

Palmeiras won 5–3 on aggregate.

Atlético Mineiro won 4–2 on aggregate.

Semi-finals

First leg

Second leg

Vasco da Gama won 5–1 on aggregate.

Palmeiras won 6–1 on aggregate.

Final

First leg

Second leg

Final

References

External links
- Copa Mercosur 2000

Copa Mercosur
3
Merc